The Kleitman–Wang algorithms are two different algorithms in graph theory solving the digraph realization problem, i.e. the question if there exists for a finite list of nonnegative integer pairs a simple directed graph such that its degree sequence is exactly this list. For a positive answer the list of integer pairs is called digraphic. Both algorithms construct a special solution if one exists or prove that one cannot find a positive answer. These constructions are based on recursive algorithms. Kleitman and Wang  gave these algorithms in 1973.

Kleitman–Wang algorithm (arbitrary choice of pairs)
The algorithm is based on the following theorem.

List  is digraphic if and only if the finite list  has nonnegative integer pairs and is digraphic.

Note that the pair  is arbitrarily with the exception of pairs . If the given list  digraphic then the theorem will be applied at most  times  setting in each further step . This process ends when the whole list  consists of  pairs. When the list  cannot be reduced to a list  of nonnegative integer pairs in any step of this approach, the theorem proves that the list  from the beginning is not digraphic.

Kleitman–Wang algorithm (maximum choice of a pair)
The algorithm is based on the following theorem.

Let  be a finite list of nonnegative integers such that  and let  be a pair such that  is maximal with respect to the lexicographical order under all pairs . List  is digraphic if and only if the finite list  has nonnegative integer pairs and is digraphic.

Note that the list  must not be in lexicographical order as in the first version. If the given list  is digraphic, then the theorem will be applied at most  times, setting in each further step . This process ends when the whole list  consists of  pairs. When the list  cannot be reduced to a list  of nonnegative integer pairs in any step of this approach, the theorem proves that the list  from the beginning is not digraphic.

See also
Fulkerson–Chen–Anstee theorem

References

Graph algorithms